Tito Emanuel Andrade Silva (born 10 May 1986) is a Portuguese football player who plays for CD Ribeira Brava.

Club career
He made his professional debut in the Primeira Liga for Marítimo on 11 January 2008, when he came on as a half-time substitute for Wênio in a 1-3 loss to Paços de Ferreira.

References

External links
Tito Silva at ZeroZero

1986 births
Sportspeople from Funchal
Living people
Portuguese footballers
C.S. Marítimo players
Varzim S.C. players
A.D. Camacha players
CD Ribeira Brava players
Primeira Liga players
Liga Portugal 2 players
Association football midfielders